The Men's individual pursuit at the 2008 Summer Paralympics took place on September 7–9 at the Laoshan Velodrome.

Classification
The cyclists are given a classification depending on the type and extent of their disability. The classification system allows cyclists to compete against others with a similar level of function.

Cycling classes:
B&VI 1–3: Blind and visually impaired cyclists
LC 1–4: Cyclists with a locomotor disability
CP 1–4: Cyclists with cerebral palsy

B&VI 1–3

The men's individual pursuit (B&VI 1–3) took place on September 7.

Preliminaries 

Q = Qualifier
WR = World Record

CP 3

The men's individual pursuit (CP 3) took place on 7 September. The pre-event favorite to win the gold medal was reigning champion, Darren Kenny of Great Britain.

Preliminaries 

Q = Qualifier
WR = World Record

CP 4

The men's individual pursuit (CP 4) took place on 7 September.

Preliminaries 

Q = Qualifier

LC 1

The men's individual pursuit (LC 1) took place on 8 September.

Preliminaries 

Q = Qualifier

LC 2

The men's individual pursuit (LC 2) took place on 8 September.

Preliminaries 

Q = Qualifier

LC 3

The men's individual pursuit (LC 3) took place on 9 September.

Preliminaries 

Q = Qualifier
WR = World Record

LC 4

The men's individual pursuit (LC 4) took place on 9 September.

Preliminaries 

Q = Qualifier
WR = World Record

References 

Men's individual pursuit